Afrasura emma is a moth of the  subfamily Arctiinae that can be found in Gabon and Nigeria.

References

External links

Moths described in 2009
emma
Erebid moths of Africa